Dai Linjing was a Chinese footballer who played as a forward for the Chinese national football team.

Career statistics

International

International goals
Scores and results list China's goal tally first.

References

1906 births
1968 deaths
Chinese footballers
China international footballers
Association football forwards
China national football team managers
Chinese football managers
National Chiao Tung University (Shanghai) alumni